Duisburg-Entenfang is a railway station in southern Duisburg, Germany.

The station was opened in 1982 and closed on December 15, 2019.

The station lies on the eastern side of the freight sidings on the freight-only line to Düsseldorf. It is situated next to a small lake, after which the station is named. The single track ends in a buffer stop just a few metres shy of the platform end. Passenger access to the other side of the freight yard is provided by a dirt track leading to a bridge overpass. No other public transport serves the vicinity of the station.

References

External links
Google Maps aerial photo

Railway stations in North Rhine-Westphalia
Buildings and structures in Duisburg
Transport in Duisburg
Railway stations in Germany opened in 1982
1982 establishments in West Germany